Kevin Graf (born June 17, 1991) is an American football offensive tackle who is currently a free agent. He was signed by the Philadelphia Eagles as an undrafted free agent in 2014. He played college football at USC.

College career
Graf played one season of football at Oaks Christian High School He played both Basketball and Football at Agoura High School. He graduated with a degree in communications and a minor in occupational therapy from the University of Southern California.

He started 39 games at right tackle for the Trojans in his sophomore year, receiving an honorable mention to the 2011 CollegeFootballNews.com sophomore team. He played 14 games as a senior, and received an honorable mention for All-Pac-12 Conference honors.

Professional career

Philadelphia Eagles
Graf was signed by the Eagles on May 13, 2014 as an undrafted free agent. He played with the club for several weeks before being relegated to the practice squad. He was released by the Eagles on August 30, 2015.

Indianapolis Colts
On April 20, 2016, Graf signed with the Indianapolis Colts. On August 26, 2016, Graf was released from the Colts' injured reserve with an injury settlement.

Atlanta Falcons
On November 29, 2016, Graf was signed to the Atlanta Falcons' practice squad. He was promoted to the active roster on December 6, 2016. He was released on December 12, 2016 and re-signed back to the practice squad. He signed a reserve/future contract with the Falcons on February 7, 2017. He was waived on August 30, 2017.

Personal life
Kevin is the son of Allan and Betty Graf. He has two siblings, a brother named Derek and a sister named Nicole. His father and brother both played for USC. His father was part of the 1972 National Championship team. He graduated from Agoura High School in 2009. Graf is married to Samantha Hansen, daughter of LA Angels hitting coach and former MLB infielder Dave Hansen.

References

External links
USC Trogans bio
Philadelphia Eagles bio

1991 births
Living people
American football offensive tackles
USC Trojans football players
Atlanta Falcons players
Philadelphia Eagles players
Indianapolis Colts players